Howard Porter may refer to:

Howard Porter (artist), American comic book artist from southern Connecticut
Howard Porter (basketball) (1948–2007), American professional basketball player
Howard Porter (manufacturer), an Australian industrial company